The 5th FINA World Junior Synchronised Swimming Championships was held June 29-July 3, 1997, in Moscow, Russia. The synchronised swimmers are aged between 15 and 18 years old from 27 nations, swimming in three events: Solo, Duet and Team.

Participating nations
27 nations swam at the 1997 World Junior Championships were:

Results

References

FINA World Junior Synchronised Swimming Championships
1997 in synchronized swimming
Swimming
Jun
International aquatics competitions hosted by Russia
Synchronised swimming in Russia